Fritz Jack (24 December 1879 – 15 May 1966) was a German fencer. He competed at the 1908, 1912 and 1928 Summer Olympics.

References

External links

1879 births
1966 deaths
German male fencers
Olympic fencers of Germany
Fencers at the 1908 Summer Olympics
Fencers at the 1912 Summer Olympics
Fencers at the 1928 Summer Olympics